Ninjago (previously known as Ninjago: Masters of Spinjitzu until 2019) is a computer-animated television series. The show was produced by Wil Film ApS from the pilot episodes until the tenth season and by WildBrain Studios for the last five seasons. It is distributed by The Lego Group. It was created to coincide with the Lego Ninjago construction toys, and centres on the fictional world of Ninjago, telling the story of a group of teenage ninja and their battles against the forces of evil. 

The pilot episodes were aired in January 2011, coinciding with the launch of the Lego Ninjago toy line. Their popularity led to the commissioning of the first two full seasons (Rise of the Snakes and Legacy of the Green Ninja), which each consisted of 13 episodes. The first season aired on 2 December 2011. Both the Lego theme and the TV series had an intended shelf life of three years, so it was expected that the second season would be the last. However, after feedback from fans, it was soon revived and it continued for ten more years. In 2017, a film adaptation of the series, The Lego Ninjago Movie, was released. In the eighth season of the show in 2018, the animation software of the show was updated and new character designs and aesthetics were adopted from the film. Despite these aesthetic changes, the eighth season continued the story of the previous seasons instead of the film's rebooted storyline. With the release of the eleventh season in 2019, the show dropped the "Masters of Spinjitzu" subtitle and switched from a 22-minute format to an 11-minute running time. In total, 15 seasons were produced, along with two pilot episodes, several mini movies, a special, a four-episode miniseries, and a theme park movie.

Series overview

Wil Film Aps (2011–2019)

Pilot episodes (2011)

Season 1: Rise of the Snakes (2011–12)

Season 2: Legacy of the Green Ninja (2012)

Season 3: Rebooted (2014)

Season 4: Tournament of Elements (2015)

Season 5: Possession (2015)

Season 6: Skybound (2016)

Special: Day of the Departed (2016)

Season 7: Hands of Time (2017)

Season 8: Sons of Garmadon (2018)

Season 9: Hunted (2018)

Season 10: March of the Oni (2019)

WildBrain (2019–2022)

Season 11: Secrets of the Forbidden Spinjitzu (2019-20)

Season 12: Prime Empire (2020)

Season 13: Master of the Mountain (2020)

Miniseries: The Island (2021)

Season 14: Seabound (2021)

Season 15: Crystalized (2022)

Mini movies

Webisodes (2011)
These mini movies were released in 2011 and show the lives of the ninja between the pilot episodes and the first season. They also show how Lord Garmadon was banished to the Underworld and then managed to take over.

Chen mini-movies (2015)

Tall Tales (2016)
The Tall Tales series of shorts cover the "backstories" of the different members of Nadakhan's crew on Misfortune's Keep. However, according to Tommy Andreasen, these shorts are not canon.

Wu's Teas (2017)
Wu's Teas is a series of twenty Ninjago shorts. It focuses on Wu's new tea shop, "Steeper Wisdom", and their rivalry with the coffee shop. The series can be watched as a single 20 minute "episode" or as 20 individual shorts. These shorts are not canon. The shorts were released as one episode on July 13, 2017.

Ninjago: Decoded (2017–2018)
Ninjago: Decoded is a short series that was released on November 23, 2017. It takes place chronologically before season 8. These shorts recycle scenes from the seventh season with different voice acting, as well as clips from previous episodes.

Tales from the Monastery of Spinjitzu (2018)
Tales from the Monastery of Spinjitzu is a series of six canon shorts from the Lego website released on December 19, 2018, made to promote the Ninjago Legacy sets. Some are made-up flashbacks while others take place between seasons 9 and 10.

Prime Empire Original Shorts (2020)
Prime Empire Original Shorts is a series of six short films that were released on the Lego YouTube channel as a prequel to the release of the twelfth season titled Prime Empire.

Ninjago: Reimagined (2021)
Ninjago: Reimagined is a series of five short films released on the Lego YouTube channel to celebrate the ten-year anniversary of Ninjago using a variety of animation styles.

The Virtues of Spinjitzu (2022)
Master Wu teaches the ninja about the six fundamental virtues of Spinjitzu.

Theatrical movie

The Lego Ninjago Movie (2017)

{{Episode table
|caption=The Lego Ninjago Movie
|show_caption=y
|background=#330066
|title=
|titleT=Title
|titleR=
|director=Charlie Bean, Paul Fisher & Bob Logan
|writer=Bob Logan, Paul Fisher, William Wheeler, Tom Wheeler, Jared Stern, & John Whittington{{small|Story:''' Hilary Winston, Bob Logan, Paul Fisher, William Wheeler, Tom Wheeler, Dan Hageman & Kevin Hageman}}
|airdate=October 29, 2016
|airdateT=Original air date
|country=US
|episodes=

|ShortSummary = A young teenage ninja, Lloyd Garmadon attempts to accept the truth about his villainous father and learn to become a true ninja warrior while a new threat emerges to endanger his homeland.
|LineColor = 330066
}}

Attraction
Master of the 4th DimensionLego Ninjago: Master of the 4th Dimension is a 12-minute 3D/4D animated short film first released on 12 January 2018 in Legoland theme parks. The short follows Wu trying to teach the ninja a lesson in perspective. The short marks the last time the ninjas' original designs prior to season 8 were used, as well as the first time where Sam Vincent voices Lloyd, replacing Jillian Michaels after seven seasons.

See also
 Lloyd Garmadon
 Lego Ninjago
 Ninjago (TV series)
 The Lego Ninjago Movie''
 The Lego Ninjago Movie (theme)
 The Lego Ninjago Movie Video Game

References

External links
 Ninjago Videos at Cartoon Network.com

Masters of Spinjitzu episodes
Lego television series
Lists of Canadian children's animated television series episodes